DePaul College Prep is a Catholic high school located in Chicago, Illinois, United States. It is located on the north side of Chicago at 3300 N Campbell Ave. DePaul College Prep is sponsored by the Western Province of the Congregation of the Mission, also known as the Vincentians.

School history
Gordon Technical High School opened in 1952 as an all-male school at the corner of Division Street and Greenview Avenue in Chicago's Polish Downtown with an initial enrollment of 325 students. The school was originally named in honor of the Very Reverend Francis Gordon, an influential and high-ranking member of the Congregation of the Resurrection, a Polish religious order. Its first principal was the Rev. John Dzielski C.R. The school was located at the previous campus of Archbishop Weber High School,  also run by the Congregation of the Resurrection, which had relocated to the Belmont-Cragin neighborhood in 1950. The school was founded at the request of Cardinal Samuel Stritch, who envisioned a new type of Catholic high school, one that had both a college preparatory curriculum and a technical curriculum. The school moved to its second and longest-serving campus in 1961, at the corner of Addison and California. By the early 1970s, the school reached a peak enrollment of 2,800 students. The school formally shortened its name to Gordon Tech College Prep in 1999. In 2001, a new school motto was adopted, Ad Societatem Resurgendum (For the Resurrection of Society),  replacing the old motto Ad Viros Faciendos (For the Making of Men). The school was all-male until declining enrollments and regional gentrification during the 1990s (including the closure of all-female Madonna High School in June 2001) prompted the school to begin admitting girls in August 2002.

In 2012, a group of trustees and administrators of DePaul University was asked by the Archdiocese of Chicago and the priests and brothers of the Congregation of the Resurrection to assist Gordon Tech College Prep. As the academic partnership with DePaul University progressed, the Board of Directors announced on March 12, 2014 that the names of the high school and its campus would be changed to DePaul College Prep and the Father Gordon Campus, respectively, as early as summer of that year.  The religious sponsorship of the school transferred from the Resurrectionists to the Vincentians in September 2019.

On August 1, 2019, in response to growing enrollment and an aging campus, the Board of Directors & Administration announced the purchase of a 17-acre campus at 3300 N. Campbell Ave from Adtalem Global Education, formerly housing a campus for DeVry University.  The school moved to its new location throughout the summer of 2020, beginning the 2020-2021 school year at the new campus in August 2020.  The new campus was dedicated on September 19, 2020, and the school continues to expand the campus.

Academics
DePaul College Prep is a co-ed college prep high school. DePaul Prep offers college prep, AP, Honors and International Baccalaureate classes on campus and dual enrollment classes at DePaul University.

Co-curricular activities
DePaul Prep has over 35 co-curriculars, clubs and academic teams on campus for students.

Athletics
The DePaul College Prep Rams compete in two conferences. The men's teams compete in the Chicago Catholic League (CCL) while the women compete in the Girls Catholic Athletic Conference (GCAC). The school competes in state championship series sponsored by the Illinois High School Association (IHSA). The current school colors are blue, white and red, though they were originally orange and blue and formerly orange and gray.

The school sponsors athletic teams for men and women in basketball, bowling, cross country, soccer, golf, track & field, volleyball, baseball, softball, football, wrestling, lacrosse, tennis, ice hockey, and cheer. 

The following teams have placed in the top four of their respective state tournaments sponsored by the IHSA:
Basketball (boys)
 2nd place (1989–90)
 3rd place (2018-2019)
 #1 ranking in Illinois and #23 in the country (2020-2021)
 3rd place (2021-2022)
Football
 State Champions (1980–81)
 State Semi-Finalist (1985–86)
Cross Country (boys)
 State Champions (2022-2023)
Cross Country (girls)
 2nd place (2022-2023)

The school also claims two Chicago Prep Bowl championships in football (1982, 1987).

The school used to support an interscholastic fencing team, and competed as a founding member of the Great Lakes High School Fencing Conference (which represents teams from Wisconsin, Illinois and Indiana). The team won the Midwest Boys' Title in 1981, 1984, 1985 and 1988. The boys' fencing team won the Illinois state championship (IHSA) in 1977 and 1980.

Notable alumni

 Louis Antonelli (class of 1981) – independent filmmaker and director.
 Gregg Bingham (class of 1969) – former Houston Oilers linebacker.
 Chris Bourjos - former MLB player for the San Francisco Giants.
 Jason Gedrick (born Jason Gedroic) (class of 1982) - actor from stage, film, and television (Iron Eagle, Murder One, Luck, Dexter).
 Tom Kleinschmidt (class of 1991) – former DePaul University and professional basketball player; men's head coach at DePaul Prep.
 Lawrence Langowski (class of 2003) - wrestler who represented Mexico in the 120 kilogram weight class at the 2008 Summer Olympics.
 Theodore Matlak (class of 1983) - former 32nd ward Chicago alderman.
 Robert Meschbach (class of 1976) - professional soccer player who set a national high school record with 71 goals in one season.
 Dennis Tufano (class of 1967) - original lead singer of The Buckinghams, a 1960s Chicago rock and roll group.
 Ken Warzynski (Class of 1966) - basketball player at DePaul University, was a 2nd Round draft pick of the Detroit Pistons and played professionally.
 Raequan Williams (class of 2015) - professional football player on the Philadelphia Eagles; college football player at Michigan State University.
 Jitim Young (class of 2000) - basketball player at Northwestern University and the Phoenix Suns (summer league), Chicago Bulls (preseason) and San Antonio Spurs (free agent camp); also played in Europe, the Dominican Republic and Israel.

References

External links
 DePaul College Prep Homepage

Catholic schools in Chicago
Educational institutions established in 1952
Private high schools in Chicago
Catholic secondary schools in Illinois
1952 establishments in Illinois